Julián Muñoz (born 11 July 1946) is a Costa Rican alpine skier. He competed at the 1988 Winter Olympics and the 1992 Winter Olympics.

References

1946 births
Living people
Costa Rican male alpine skiers
Olympic alpine skiers of Costa Rica
Alpine skiers at the 1988 Winter Olympics
Alpine skiers at the 1992 Winter Olympics
Sportspeople from San Francisco